The 91st Assembly District of Wisconsin is one of 99 districts of the Wisconsin State Assembly. Located in western Wisconsin, the district covers most of the city of Eau Claire, Wisconsin, in northwest Eau Claire County.  It contains landmarks such as the University of Wisconsin–Eau Claire campus, Confluence Commercial Historic District, Water Street Historic District, Carson Park, and the historic U.S. Post Office and Courthouse.  The district is represented by Democrat Jodi Emerson, since January 2019.

The 91st Assembly district is located within Wisconsin's 31st Senate district, along with the 92nd and 93rd Assembly districts.

List of past representatives

References 

Wisconsin State Assembly districts
Eau Claire County, Wisconsin